Mercato (Italian for "market") is a neighbourhood or quartiere of Naples, southern Italy. It is in the south-eastern part of the city, bounded by the industrial port of Naples on the south.

At the center of the area is the Piazza del Mercato or "market square", the medieval market place of the city. At the apex of the half-moon of the piazza is the church of Santa Croce e Purgatorio al Mercato. Visible to the east and west respectively are the belltowers and parts of the façade of Sant'Eligio Maggiore and the church of Santa Maria del Carmine. The square was the site of the execution of Conradin.

It was also where Masaniello's revolt broke out and also the site of the executions after the royalist retaking of the kingdom after the fall of the Neapolitan Republic of 1799.

The area was somewhat cut off from the rest of the city, inland, by the urban renewal of the early 1900s. Also, it was severely damaged by bombings in World War II. It is currently (2006) in the midst of ambitious development.

References

Sources
 Napoli e i Luoghi Celebri delle sue Vicinanze, Napoli 1845 online version

Quartieri of Naples